In Japanese folklore, the Takarabune, or "Treasure Ship", is a mythical ship piloted through the heavens by the Seven Lucky Gods during the first three days of the New Year. A picture of the ship forms an essential part of traditional Japanese New Year celebrations.

The ship
During the first three days of the New Year the Seven Lucky Gods are said to pilot through the heavens and into human ports a mythical ship called the Takarabune, or "Treasure Ship".

Woodblock prints
A picture of the ship forms an essential part of traditional Japanese New Year celebrations. According to custom, placing a Takarabune woodblock print beneath a pillow on the night of 2 January may induce a lucky dream – a sign that the year to come will be fortunate. In the event of an unpleasant dream, the print may be disposed of by throwing it into a river.

The custom of putting a picture under the pillow started around the Muromachi period. It was initially popular among the nobility, and spread to commoners during the later Edo period. Street vendors sold cheap woodblock prints, intended for single use.

Many Takarabune prints show a crane above and a turtle below, representative of longevity and felicity, as well as  a palindromic poem which tells of a long night in a boat.  At dawn, the sound of waves is heard and smooth sailing seen ahead.

References

See also
 Hatsuyume

Japanese folk religion
New Year celebrations
Mythological ships